The Djoua River is a tributary of the Ivindo River in Gabon and the Republic of the Congo. The river arises in the Congo and flows west, forming part of the international boundary between the two countries.

The river is one of the major tributaries of the Ogooué River, the 4th largest river in Africa by flow volume after the Congo, Niger and Zambezi rivers.

Rivers of Gabon
Rivers of the Republic of the Congo
International rivers of Africa
Republic of the Congo–Gabon border
Border rivers